Giugliano in Campania , also known simply as Giugliano, is a city and comune in the Metropolitan City of Naples, Campania, Italy. , it had some 124,000 inhabitants, making it the most populated Italian city that is not a provincial capital.

History
In 5th-4th century BCE the territory of Giugliano was settled by the Osci, who founded, among the many cities, Atella and Liternum, both of them flourished under the dominion of Rome. The area is that known as Terra di Lavoro, which was the most fertile part of Campania felix. 

Near "Lake Patria", there was the ancient city of Liternum. In 194 BC it became a Roman colony. The town is mainly famous as the residence of the elder Scipio Africanus, who withdrew from Rome and died there. His tomb and villa are described by Seneca the Younger. In 455, the town was pillaged and destroyed by Genseric and his Vandals. The surviving population migrated to the present historical center of Giugliano.

The city remained a small center until 1207, when Cuma was destroyed by the Neapolitans; some of the citizens from that town, including the clergy and the cathedral capitular, took shelter in Giugliano. The first documents mentioning a fief in Giugliano dates from 1270.

Lords of the city were, in sequence, the Vulcano, Filomarino, Pignatelli, D'Aquino, Pinelli and Colonna.

Geography
It is located in a fertile coastal plain north of Naples, thus serving as a market for agricultural products to the city. The plain on which it sits was known in ancient Roman times as the Campania Felix.

Neighboring communes
Giugliano in Campania borders the following municipalities: Aversa, Casapesenna,   Castel Volturno, Lusciano, Melito di Napoli, Mugnano di Napoli, Parete, Pozzuoli, Qualiano, Quarto, San Cipriano d'Aversa, Sant'Antimo, Trentola-Ducenta, Villa Literno and Villaricca.

Main sights
Palazzo Pinelli, built in 1545 by architect Giovanni Francesco di Palma. It had a side tower, which was later demolished.
Church of Santa Sofia (17th century), designed by Domenico Fontana. It was finished in 1730-1745 by the Neapolitan architect Domenico Antonio Vaccaro. It houses the tomb of Giovan Battista Basile.
Church of the Annunziata, known from the 16th century. It is home to several canvasses by Neapolitan artists such as Massimo Stanzione and Carlo Sellitto. it has a nave with apse and transept; the pulpit is in Roccoco style, while the rest of the interior is decorated in Baroque style. Notable are also the large wooden organ (late 16th century), the Chapel of Madonna della Pace and early 16th Stories of the Virgin' in the left transept.
Church of Sant'Anna. Of the original building, existing in the 14th century, the bell tower remains. It houses 16th-century paintings by Fabrizio Santafede and Pietro Negroni.
Church of Madonna delle Grazie, with a 14th-century bell tower and a 16th-century portal. The interior has a 15th-century Gothic Incoronation of the Virgin and early 16th-century frescoes.
Church of Santa Maria della Purità or of the Souls of Purgatory(18th century). It was designed by Domenico Antonio Vaccaro, who also designed the internal stuccos and the covering of the dome, made as fish scales. The structure is an octagonal plant and has four altars, besides the greater one.
Ancient town of Liternum''. The excavations brought to light, between 1930 and 1936, some elements of the city center (forum with a temple, a basilica and a small theater) dating from the beginning of the Roman Empire. Outside the city walls, the remains of the amphitheater and the necropolis have been identified.
Lake Patria, in the frazione of the same name, it was called by ancient Roman "Literna Palus". It is part of the Natural Reserve "Foce Volurno - Costa di Licola".

Transportation
Giugliano is served by Naples–Aversa railway, a railway suburban train connection to the Naples Metro. Another station, Giugliano-Qualiano, is located some kilometers outside the city. It is part of the Villa Literno–Naples line, a branch of the Rome–Formia–Naples railway.

Famous people
 Giovan Battista Basile, poet, courtier, and fairy tale collector
 Scipio Africanus, Roman general
 Fatal Quiet, philosopher and main develooper of “Groders”
 Adriana Basile, composer and singer
 Raffaele Cantone, magistrate
 Nicola Mignogna, politician and a significant contributor of “Risorgimento”

See also
S.S.C. Giugliano
Liternum
Licola

References

Bibliography

External links

 Giugliano official website 

 
Cities and towns in Campania
421 BC
Populated places established in the 5th century BC
Osci
Italic archaeological sites
5th-century BC establishments